The Church of Vilupulli — — is a Catholic church located in the town of Vilupulli, commune of Chonchi, on the Chiloé Archipelago, Los Lagos Region, southern Chile.

The Church of Vilupulli was declared a National Monument of Chile in 1971 and
is one of the 16 Churches of Chiloé that were declared  UNESCO World Heritage Sites on 30 November 2000.

Built at the beginning of the 20th century, the patron saint of the church of Vilupulli is St Anthony – also the patron saint of the Church of Colo – whose feast day is celebrated on June 13.

This church belongs to the parish of San Carlos, Chonchi, one of the 24 parishes that form the Diocese of Ancud.

See also
Churches of Chiloé

References 

Wooden churches in Chile
World Heritage Sites in Chile
Roman Catholic churches in Chile
Colonial architecture in Chile
Churches in Chiloé Archipelago